John Mason Durie  (1 July 1889 – 20 April 1971) was a New Zealand tribal leader, interpreter, public servant, farmer, and community leader.

Background 
Of Māori descent, he identified with the Ngāti Kauwhata and Rangitāne iwi. He was born in Aorangi, in the Manawatū, in 1889. Eddie Durie and Mason Durie are his grandsons.

Durie died on 20 April 1971 in the same house he was born in.

References

1889 births
1971 deaths
New Zealand farmers
Interpreters
New Zealand public servants
Rangitāne people
New Zealand Māori public servants
People educated at Te Aute College
New Zealand Officers of the Order of the British Empire
20th-century translators
Mason